Keith St. Onge is a professional barefoot water skier. He holds the record for the most U.S. National Overall Pro titles at fourteen, a record previously held by Ron Scarpa. Keith is a two-time World Barefoot Champion, winning Overall titles in 2006 and 2008.

Keith learned to barefoot water ski on Lake Umbagog in New Hampshire at the age of nine with instruction from Mike Seipel, a two-time World Barefoot Champion.  He entered his first barefoot tournament at age ten in the Eastern Region.

Keith co-founded the World Barefoot Center with four-time World Barefoot Champion, David Small.

World records 
Keith St. Onge is the only professional barefoot water skier to hold world records in all three events: Slalom; Jump and Tricks.

Awards 
1996 Banana George Blair Barefooter of the Year
2006 IWWF (International Waterski & Wakeboard Federation) Male Athlete of the Year
2009 IWWF (International Waterski & Wakeboard Federation) Male Athlete of the Year

References 

Sportspeople from Nashua, New Hampshire
Year of birth missing (living people)
Place of birth missing (living people)
Living people
Competitors at the 2001 World Games
World Games gold medalists